is a Japanese voice actress and singer from Chiba Prefecture. Kusuda is currently affiliated with Just Pro. Kusuda is best known as Nozomi Toujou in Love Live! School Idol Project series, and has worked with the other Love Live! girls in singing multiple songs that have charted on Oricon. Kusuda's other major roles include Suko in Million Doll and Rose in Rilu Rilu Fairilu. Her nickname is "Kussun".

Career
Prior to entering the anime industry, Kusuda worked in a maid cafe in Akihabara called Cafe la vie en rose. Kusuda decided to become a voice actress after seeing a stage performance of Junko Takeuchi (the voice of Naruto Uzumaki). Kusuda made her debut as a voice actress as Nozomi Tojo in the media franchise Love Live!, and she separately formed the duo unit, Please&Secret, with co-star Pile, who voiced Maki Nishikino. In 2013, Kusuda joined the idol unit Tabikare Girls, which released its first single that November. In the same year, Kusuda formed a unit with Pile called “Please&Secret.” Kusuda released a CD on November 6, 2013, together with a new JTB Music Unit called “Tabi College Girls” (タビカレガールズ), together with Yui Watanabe, Rikako Yamaguchi, Rika Nishimori, and Mami Sumi.

She is also as a member of a mini unit in Love Live! project series, Lily White, alongside Riho Iida (voice of Rin Hoshizora) and Suzuko Mimori (voice of Umi Sonoda).

Filmography

Television anime

Theatrical animation

OVA

Games

Discography

Singles

Albums

Please&Secret
With Pile

References

External links 
Official blog 
Official website 

1989 births
Living people
Anime singers
Japanese women pop singers
Japanese video game actresses
Japanese voice actresses
Musicians from Chiba Prefecture
Μ's members
Voice actresses from Chiba Prefecture
21st-century Japanese women singers
21st-century Japanese singers
21st-century Japanese actresses